Siberia Acoustic (alternately stylized as Siberia (Acoustic)) is the second acoustic album recorded by Canadian electropop artist Lights, featuring acoustic reworkings of songs off her second studio album, Siberia (2011). It was released April 30, 2013 through Universal Music Group and Last Gang Records. The album was preceded on March 15 by the release of its first and only single, "Cactus in the Valley", which was re-recorded as a duet with American electronica project Owl City.

Upon its release, Siberia Acoustic debuted at number seven on the Billboard Canadian Albums Chart and at number 86 on the Billboard 200, her second-highest peak on either chart at the time. The album received generally positive reviews from contemporary music critics, who found that the acoustic production put emphasis on Lights's songwriting talents but also made the songs less compelling than in their studio renditions.

Critical reception

Siberia Acoustic received mostly positive reviews from contemporary music critics for showcasing her abilities as a singer-songwriter. At AllMusic, reviewer Matt Collar wrote that "although Lights normally makes electronic pop that often features electric guitars, keyboards, and dance-influenced beats, she is at her core a melodic singer-songwriter. Not surprisingly, many of the songs on Siberia lend themselves to these intimate re-recordings." He rated the album 4 stars out of 5. Brent Faulkner of PopMatters responded positively to Lights' vocals on the album ("Lights sounds superb throughout," he writes) but ultimately felt the acoustic soundscape "fails to compel as much" as Siberia′s original production. "All in all," he summarized before delivering a 6/10 rating, "Siberia Acoustic is enjoyable if sometimes bland."

Claire Louise Sheridan of Alter the Press! gave a particularly complimentary review in which she highlights Lights's vocal range and interpretive abilities. "No matter what your previous impressions of Lights may be," writes Sheridan, "cast them aside. Siberia Acoustic is a truly different experience which allows appreciation of the overwhelming beauty of her talent and thus the true basis of her appeal."

Track listing

Credits and personnel
Credits for Siberia Acoustic adapted from AllMusic.

Performance credits
 All vocals – Lights
 Featured vocals – Owl City (Adam Young), Max Kerman, Coeur de Pirate

Instruments
 Cello – Kevin Fox
 Guitar – Lights
 Piano – Lights

Production
 Engineers – Jason Dufour, Stephen Koszler
 Assistant engineers – Arthur Bastos, Jack Clow
 Mastering – João Carvalho
 Mixer – Jason Dufour
 Producer – Lights
 Songwriters – Brian Borcherdt, Jason Parsons, Lights Poxleitner, Thomas "Tawgs" Salter, Dave Thomson, Graham Walsh

Packaging
 Creative director – Lights
 Designer – Simon Paul
 Photographers – Tina Lok, Katie Rodriguez

Charts

Release history

References

2013 albums
Lights (musician) albums
Universal Music Group albums
Last Gang Records albums